Verkh-Chumanka is a rural locality (a selo) and the administrative center of Verkh-Chumansky Selsoviet of Bayevsky District, Altai Krai, Russia. The population was 847 as of 2016. There are 18 streets.

Geography
Plotava is the nearest rural locality.

Ethnicity
The village is inhabited by Russians and others.

References

Rural localities in Bayevsky District